Luca Paudice (born 30 October 2001) is an Italian professional footballer who plays as a forward for  club Recanatese on loan from Mantova.

Club career
Formed on Avellino and Potenza youth, Paudice made his senior debut on Serie C club Savoia.

On 4 February 2020, he was loaned to Ciliverghe Calcio.

On 28 June 2021, Paudice was transferred to Mantova.

On 16 January 2023, Paudice extended his contract with Mantova until 2025 and joined Recanatese on loan for the rest of the 2022–23 season.

References

External links
 
 

2001 births
Living people
Italian footballers
Association football forwards
Serie C players
Serie D players
U.S. Savoia 1908 players
Mantova 1911 players
U.S.D. Recanatese 1923 players